Nameless is an unincorporated community in Jackson County, Tennessee, United States.

History
The community's unusual name has attracted attention from writers. There is no agreement on its origin. One version of the name's origin holds that when residents applied for a post office, the place for a name on the application was left blank, and the U.S. Post Office Department returned the application with "Nameless" stamped on the form. In the 1982 book Blue Highways: A Journey Into America, William Least Heat-Moon reported a variant explanation in which the residents themselves decided that the community should be "nameless" after one of them said "This here’s a nameless place if I ever seen one, so leave it be." Another variation of the story was provided in a 1933 article in the Jackson County Sentinel newspaper, which said that a local official had initially sought to name the post office "Morgan" for county attorney general George Morgan, but the Post Office Department had rejected that name, possibly because the name "Morgan" was still associated in people's minds with the Confederacy, including Confederate Army General John Hunt Morgan. According to this version, after his first choice was rejected the official wrote to federal authorities that if his original request could not be used, he preferred for the post office to be nameless. The Nameless post office was established in 1866 and operated until 1909.

At its peak, Nameless had a population of about 250. In addition to its post office, it was the site of a school and some stores. The two-room elementary school operated until the 1960s. It housed "primer" through grade 4 in one room and grades 5 through 8 in a second room. The former J.T. Watts General Merchandise Store is now operated as a museum.

In popular culture

Nameless is mentioned in the Elvis Costello song "My Dark Life" (on the album Extreme Honey) together with two other places with unusual names, Ugly, Texas, and Peculiar, Missouri.

See also
No Name, Colorado
No Name Key, Florida
Unusual place names

References

Unincorporated communities in Jackson County, Tennessee
Unincorporated communities in Tennessee